Wout Neelen (born on 20 October 2000) is a Dutch footballer who plays as a centre-back for ASWH. He has also played as midfielder.

Club career 
Wout Neelen played in the youth of RKSV Cluzona and NAC Breda. In 2019 he made the switch to Jong NAC and was occasionally in the selection of the first squad, initially as a bencher.

Neelen made his senior squad debut on 8 March 2020, in a 4–1 home win against Roda JC Kerkrade. He came on in the 90+1 minute for Jan Paul van Hecke. In June 2020 he signed his first professional contract. On 11 March 2022, Neelen played his first full game in the Eerste Divisie against De Graafschap. NAC won this game 2–0, also thanks to Neelen's contribution to its defense.

Later in 2022, Neelen was released from NAC Breda making him a free player by the end of the year. On 5 June, he signed with ASWH that was about to relegate from the Tweede to the Derde Divisie.

References 

2000 births
Living people
Dutch footballers
ASWH players
NAC Breda players
Sportspeople from Roosendaal
Footballers from North Brabant
Association football defenders
Derde Divisie players
Eerste Divisie players